Cerebro-costo-mandibular syndrome is a very rare genetic disorder which is characterized by jaw/chin, palate and rib abnormalities.

Signs and symptoms 

The following list comprises the most common symptoms people with this disorder exhibit:

 Severe micrognathia
 Thorax in the shape of a bell
 Cleft palate
 Neonatal respiratory difficulties
 Rib gaps

Common (but not the most) symptoms include:

 External auditory canal atresia
 Hearing loss
 Failure to thrive
 Glossoptosis
 Intellectual disabilities
 Fetal growth delays
 Kyphosis
 Short height
 Tracheomalacia

Not common but also not rare symptoms include:

 Fifth finger clinodactyly
 Cerebral calcification
 Hydranencephaly
 Meningocele
 Microcephaly
 Polycystic kidney dysplasia
 Myelomeningocele
 Porencephalic cyst
 Short, hard palate
 Spina bifida
 Ventricular septal defect
 Webbed neck

Causes 

This disorder is caused by autosomal dominant mutations in the SNRPB gene, in chromosome 20.

Epidemiology 

Only 110 cases have been described in medical literature.

References 

Rare genetic syndromes
Syndromes affecting the jaw
Autosomal dominant disorders